TASSC may refer to:

The Advancement of Sound Science Coalition
Torture Abolition and Survivors Support Coalition